Herbert Urlacher (born December 30, 1931) was an American politician who was a member of the North Dakota State Senate. He represented the 36th district from 1993 to 2008 as a member of the Republican party. He also sat in the North Dakota House of Representatives from 1989 to 1992. He is an alumnus of the University of North Dakota. He is a farmer and rancher.

References

1931 births
Living people
Republican Party North Dakota state senators
People from Hettinger County, North Dakota
People from Stark County, North Dakota
University of North Dakota alumni
Republican Party members of the North Dakota House of Representatives
Farmers from North Dakota
Ranchers from North Dakota